Behiç Buğra Gülsoy (born 22 February 1982) is a Turkish actor, author, screenwriter, director, producer, architect, graphic designer and photographer.

Early life 
Buğra Gülsoy was born on 22 February 1982 in Ankara, Turkey. His mother is from Erzincan. His father is from Niğde. He completed his primary, secondary and high school education in Ankara. He gained his first stage experience when he was 13. He graduated from the Eastern Mediterranean University, Faculty of Architecture and master of advanced acting in Bahçeşehir University.

Career
The movies in which he has had a role include Cebimdeki Yabancı, Acı Tatlı Ekşi, Mahalle, Görümce, Robinson Crusoe, Güzel Günler Göreceğiz, Gölgeler ve Suretler, and Güneşi Gördüm.

He came to attention for series "Unutulmaz" in 2009. In 2010, Gülsoy played the role of Vural Namlı in the internationally famous series Fatmagül'ün Suçu Ne?. Since 2011, he has portrayed Güney Tekinoğlu in the Kanal D drama series Kuzey Güney and was awarded "The best TV series actor" in 2012. He played the main role in the series Eski Hikaye as Mete. In 2015, he played the lead role in the popular romantic-comedy series Aşk Yeniden as Fatih. In 2018 he played in Kızım as Demir Göktürk. In 2020, He played as Sultan Melikşah of Seljuk Empire in historical series Uyanış: Büyük Selçuklu.

Personal life
Gülsoy dated actress Burcu Kara, they married on 22 July 2011. The pair lasted only 12 months and divorced in 2012. He married Nilüfer Gürbüz in September 2018. Together they have a son. Gülsoy and Gürbüz divorced in March 2023.

Books
Birinci Kıyamet
İkinci Kıyamet
Luna

Theatre
Pragma
Deep
Caesar Bir Denge Oyunu
Kadıncıklar
Lokomopüf

Filmography

Series

Films

Producer and director
Mahalle
Pragma
Sharzin Rabbani

Screenwriter
Acı Tatlı Ekşi
Mutluluk Zamanı
Mahalle
Pragma (theatre)

Commercial
Fuse Tea
Filli Boya
Vodafone

References

External links
 
 
 

1982 births
Living people
Turkish Muslims
Turkish architects
Turkish photographers
People from Ankara
Turkish male film actors
Turkish male television actors
Eastern Mediterranean University alumni
Turkish expatriates in Northern Cyprus